The 1983 Intercontinental Final was the ninth running of the Intercontinental Final as part of the qualification for the 1983 Speedway World Championship. The 1983 Final was run on 7 August at the White City Stadium in London, England, and was the last qualifying stage for riders from Scandinavia, the USA and from the Commonwealth nations for the World Final to be held at the Motodrom Halbemond in Norden, West Germany.

1983 Intercontinental Final
7 August
 London, White City Stadium
Qualification: Top 11 plus 1 reserve to the World Final in Norden, West Germany

References

See also
 Motorcycle Speedway

1983
World Individual
Intercontinental Final
Intercontinental Final
1983 in British motorsport